Mira McKinney (October 23, 1892 – May 2, 1978) was an American actress. She appeared in the films The Case of the Stuttering Bishop, Blazing Sixes, Young Fugitives, The Road to Reno, Garden of the Moon, Prairie Moon, The Great Waltz, I Stole a Million, The House of the Seven Gables, An Angel from Texas, Alias the Deacon, Hot Steel, Third Finger, Left Hand, Life Begins for Andy Hardy, A Dangerous Game, Double Trouble, Red River Robin Hood, Pittsburgh, Rhythm of the Islands, Moonlight in Vermont, The Mummy's Ghost, Till We Meet Again, Rough Riders of Cheyenne, Hold That Blonde, Fallen Angel, Junior Prom, Shadows Over Chinatown, Beat the Band, Linda, Be Good, Sitting Pretty, The Doolins of Oklahoma, Destination Big House, Fancy Pants, Harriet Craig, The Groom Wore Spurs, Heart of the Rockies, Rainbow 'Round My Shoulder, Francis Covers the Big Town, The Last Posse and Women's Prison, among others.

Selected filmography

Modern Times (1936) - Minister's Wife
Fury (1936) - Hysterical Townswoman at Trial (uncredited)
The President's Mystery (1936) - Phony Townswoman (uncredited)
Captains Courageous (1937) - Bit Role (uncredited)
Meet the Missus (1937) - Baving Beauty (uncredited)
The Case of the Stuttering Bishop (1937) - Ida Gilbert
Blazing Sixes (1937) - Aunt Sarah Morgan
Back in Circulation (1937) - First Matron (uncredited)
Music for Madame (1937) - Rodowsky Admirer (uncredited)
Arson Gang Busters (1938) - Lady (uncredited)
Young Fugitives (1938) - Letty
The Road to Reno (1938) - Hannah
Garden of the Moon (1938) - Sarah - Champagne Customer (uncredited)
Prairie Moon (1938) - Mrs. Higgins (uncredited)
The Sisters (1938) - Minor Role (uncredited)
The Great Waltz (1938) - Miss Dunkel (uncredited)
Sweethearts (1938) - Telephone Operator (uncredited)
Risky Business (1939) - Shirley Ann's Mother (uncredited)
Woman Doctor (1939) - Nurse (uncredited)
Cafe Society (1939) - Secretary (uncredited)
I Stole a Million (1939) - Mrs. Loomis - Laura's Landlady (uncredited)
When Tomorrow Comes (1939) - Waitress (uncredited)
Stop, Look and Love (1939) - Flower Woman (uncredited)
The Honeymoon's Over (1939) - Newspaper Woman (uncredited)
The Shop Around the Corner (1940) - Customer (uncredited)
The House of the Seven Gables (1940) - Mrs. Reynolds (uncredited)
An Angel from Texas (1940) - Mrs. Mills (uncredited)
Alias the Deacon (1940) - Mrs. Gregory
Hot Steel (1940) - Elvira Appleby
Bad Man from Red Butte (1940) - Miss Woods
Earthbound (1940) - Minor Role (uncredited)
Third Finger, Left Hand (1940) - Miss Dell (uncredited)
 Nobody's Children (1940) - Mrs. Ferber (uncredited)
Sandy Gets Her Man (1940) - Flighty Woman (uncredited)
Santa Fe Trail (1940) - Survivor at Delaware Crossing (uncredited)
Nice Girl? (1941) - Gossip (uncredited)
Bachelor Daddy (1941) - Landlady
Life Begins for Andy Hardy (1941) - Miss Gomez, Fur Store Owner (uncredited)
A Dangerous Game (1941) - Mrs. Hubbard
Father Takes a Wife (1941) - Second Lady at Launching (uncredited)
It Started with Eve (1941) - Party Guest (uncredited)
One Foot in Heaven (1941) - Movie Theatre Cashier (uncredited)
You Belong to Me (1941) - Lipstick Woman (uncredited)
Always Tomorrow: The Portrait of an American Business (1941) - Little Boy's Mother (uncredited)
Double Trouble (1941) - Mrs. Whitmore
All Through the Night (1942) - Lady Behind Gloves at Auction (uncredited)
Lady in a Jam (1942) - Lady of the Evening (uncredited)
The Mummy's Tomb (1942) - Vic's Wife (uncredited)
Red River Robin Hood (1942) - Mrs. Halstead (uncredited)
Pittsburgh (1942) - Tilda (uncredited)
Madame Spy (1942) - Red Cross Woman (uncredited)
Keep 'Em Slugging (1943) - Customer (uncredited)
Rhythm of the Islands (1943) - Miss Priddy
Moonlight in Vermont (1943) - Elvira
Standing Room Only (1944) - Wife of Colonel (uncredited)
The Mummy's Ghost (1944) - Mrs. Evans (uncredited)
Till We Meet Again (1944) - Portress (uncredited)
The Affairs of Susan (1945) - Actress at Party (uncredited)
The Man Who Walked Alone (1945) - Jail Matron
Incendiary Blonde (1945) - Nurse (voice, uncredited)
Rough Riders of Cheyenne (1945) - Harriet Sterling
Fallen Angel (1945) - Mrs. Judd (uncredited)
Hold That Blonde (1945) - Helen Sedgemore (uncredited)
Talk About a Lady (1946) - Letitia Harrison
Junior Prom (1946) - Mrs. Rogers
Cluny Brown (1946) - Author's Wife (uncredited)
Shadows Over Chinatown (1946) - Kate Johnson
I've Always Loved You (1946) - Telsman (uncredited)
Beat the Band (1947) - Mrs. Elvira Rogers
Living in a Big Way (1947) - Committee Woman (uncredited)
Something in the Wind (1947) - Old Woman (uncredited)
Railroaded! (1947) - Beauty salon owner (uncredited)
Linda, Be Good (1947) - Mrs. Thompson
T-Men (1947) - Woman (uncredited)
Sitting Pretty (1948) - Mrs. Phillips (uncredited)
Mickey (1948) - Office Nurse (uncredited)
The Snake Pit (1948) - Patient (uncredited)
The Doolins of Oklahoma (1949) - Maudie (uncredited)
Prejudice (1949) - Ma Hanson (uncredited)
Trail of the Rustlers (1950) - Mrs. J.G. Mahoney
A Woman of Distinction (1950) - Member (uncredited)
Destination Big House (1950) - Mrs. Carroll (uncredited)
Fancy Pants (1950) - Mollie (uncredited)
Harriet Craig (1950) - Mrs. Winston (uncredited)
Kansas Raiders (1950) - Woman Shouting Murder (uncredited)
Hunt the Man Down (1950) - Rolene's Aunt (uncredited)
The Groom Wore Spurs (1951) - Mrs. Forbes
Heart of the Rockies (1951) - Mrs. Edsel
The Blue Veil (1951) - Customer (uncredited)
The Unknown Man (1951) - Maid (uncredited)
Rose of Cimarron (1952) - Townswoman (uncredited)
Paula (1952) - Professor's Wife (uncredited)
Rainbow 'Round My Shoulder (1952) - Mrs. Abernathy (uncredited)
Francis Covers the Big Town (1953) - Mrs. Henry Potterby (uncredited)
The Last Posse (1953) - Mrs. Mitchell (uncredited)
The Eddie Cantor Story (1953) - Pianist (uncredited)
Women's Prison (1955) - Burke (uncredited)
The Kettles in the Ozarks (1956) - Bit Role (uncredited)

Selected Television

References

External links
 

1892 births
1978 deaths
20th-century American actresses
American film actresses